In enzymology, a hepoxilin-epoxide hydrolase is an enzyme that catalyzes the conversion of the epoxyalcohol metabolites arachidonic acid, hepoxilin A3 and hepoxilin B3 to their tri-hydroxyl products, trioxolin A3 and trioxilin B3, respectively. These reactions in general inactivate the two biologically active hepoxilins.

Enzyme activity
Hepoxilin-epoxide hydrolase converts the epoxide residue in hepoxilins A3 and B3 to Vicinal (chemistry) diols as exemplified in the following enzyme reaction for the metabolism of hepoxilin A3 to trioxilin A3:

The substrates of this enzyme are 8-hydroxy-11S,12Sepoxy-(5Z,8Z,14Z)-eicosatrienoic acid, i.e. hepoxilin A3 and H2O, whereas its product is 8,11,12-trihydroxy-(5Z,9E,14Z)-eicosatrienoic acid, i.e. the triol, trioxilin A3.

Epoxide hydrolases
Epoxide hydrolases represent a group of enzymes that convert various types of epoxides to vicinal diols.  Several members of this group have this metabolic activity on fatty acid epoxides including microsomal epoxide hydrolase (i.e. epoxide hydrolase 1 or EH1), soluble epoxide hydrolase (i.e. epoxide hydrolase 2 or EH2), epoxide hydrolase 3 (EH3), epoxide hydrolase 4 (EH4), and leukotriene A4 hydrolase (see epoxide hydrolase). The systematic name of this enzyme class is (5Z,9E,14Z)-(8xi,11R,12S)-11,12-epoxy-8-hydroxyicosa-5,9,14-trienoat e hydrolase. Other names in common use include hepoxilin epoxide hydrolase, hepoxylin hydrolase, and hepoxilin A3 hydrolase.  Since the hepoxilins are metabolites of arachidonic acid, hepoxilin-epoxide hydrolase participates in arachidonic acid metabolism.

Identity of hepoxilin-epoxide hydrolase 
Studies have shown that soluble epoxide hydrolase (i.e. epoxide hydrolase 2 or EH2) readily metabolizes a) hepoxilin A3 (8-hydroxy-11S,12Sepoxy-(5Z,8Z,14Z)-eicosatrienoic acid) to trioxilin A3 (8,11,12-trihydroxy-(5Z,9E,14Z)-eicosatrienoic acid) and b) hepoxilin B3 (10-hydroxy-11S,12Sepoxy-(5Z,9E,14Z)-eicosatrienoic acid) to trioxlin B3 (10,11,12-trihydroxy-(5Z,9E,14Z)-eicosatrienoic acid. Soluble epoxide hydrolase (i.e. epoxide hydrolase 2 or EH2) sEH also appears to be the hepoxilin hydrolase that is responsible for inactivating the epoxyalcohol metabolites of arachidonic acid, hepoxilin A3 and hepoxiin B3. Soluble epoxide hydrolase is widely expressed in a diversity of human and other mammal tissues and therefore appears to be the hepoxilin hydrolase responsible for inactivating hepoxilin A3 and B3 (see soluble epoxide hydrolase#Function and epoxide hydrolase#Hepoxilin-epoxide hydrolase). The ability of EH1, EH3, EH4, and leukotriene A4 hydrolase to metabolize hepoxilins to trioxilins has not yet been reported.

Function 
Hepoxilins possess several activities (see hepoxilin#Physiological effects) whereas their trioxilin products are generally considered to be inactive. Accordingly, the soluble epoxide hydrolase metabolic pathway is considered to function in vivo to inactivate or limit the activity of the hepoxilins. The other fatty acid epoxide hydrolases cited in the Epoxide hydrolases section (above) have not be reported for hepoxilin-epoxide hydrolase activity, could possibly exhibit this, and therefore contribute to inactivating the hepoxilins.

References

 
 
 
 

EC 3.3.2
Enzymes of unknown structure